Tranmere Rovers F.C. played the 1936–37 season in the Football League Third Division North. It was their 16th season of league football, and they finished 19th of 22. They reached the First Round of the FA Cup.

Football League

References 

Tranmere Rovers F.C. seasons